Fuladu or Fuladugu (French: Fouladougou) is a historic region in the Upper Casamance, in the south of Senegal, including certain areas in The Gambia near the border with Guinea. It corresponds roughly to the modern Kolda Department.

History
Historically, Fuladu was the last kingdom to be established in Senegal, in the second half of the nineteenth century. This kingdom was established by the Fula chief  who belonged to the Fulbe Firdu group. Before the creation of this kingdom, the Mandinka controlled the region. They had established the kingdom of Kaabu as a vassal of the Mali Empire in the fifteenth century.

Nomadic pastoralists, the Fula peoples arrived in the region in a significant way in the fourteenth century, attracted by the pastureland. Other Fula people had migrated through the region before the arrival of the second wave of Fulbe, but they did not remain long; it was this second wave that lead to a permanent presence in the region.

Initially, the Fula and the dominant Mandinka people had a good relationship. The Fula settled near the Mandinka in order to sell them dairy products produced by their cattle, in exchange for the agricultural products of the Mandinka. The Mandinka entrusted their own herds to the Fula, who circulated freely in Kaabu. Intermarriage between the two communities took place.

Later, however, the relationship between the Fula and the Mandinka deteriorated. The once mutually beneficial relationship (in which the Mandinka provided pasturage and protection in exchange for taxes, services, and gifts from the Fula) became more exploitative. Fula became vassals of the Mandinka of Kaabu and they remained so until the middle of the nineteenth century. The Mandinka kings maintained a system similar to servitude with respect to the Fula. Numerous Fula families were required to settle sedentarily in the "fulakunda", established for the Fula by the Mandinka. Many were forced to adopt agriculture, in order to supply the Mandinka, who imposed a very heavy tax on them. The Fula were victims of harassment and humiliation and had to assimilate to the culture and language of the Mandinka. The Mandinka and Fula intermarried extensively. Despite this, many Fula fought to safeguard their language, traditions, and nomadic way of life. They revolted several times, but always suffered defeat. The Mandinka justified the exactions that they practiced against the Fula as responses to these revolts.

Eventually, Alpha Molo Balde, the future founder of the Fuladu kingdom, revolted against the Mandinka, unified the Fula of Kaabu, and sought the help of the Fula of Fouta Djallon for maintaining the revolt against the kings of Kaabu (who were entitled "Mansa"). After a very difficult revolt, thanks to numerous attacks by Fouta Djallon which led to enormous casualties, Alpha Molo took control of the territory in which the Fula predominated. This marked the creation of Fuladu, stretching from the Upper Casamance up to the land north of Guinea-Bissau. In modern oral tradition, he is referred to as "Alpha the Liberator."

Before Alpha Molo, the Fula had followed the traditional religion, although there were some Fula marabouts. They now converted to Islam in large numbers in order to win the support of Fouta Djalon for the revolt, since the Almami of Fouta Djallon were opposed to followers of traditional religion, whether they were Fula, Mandinka, or others. Without this conversion to Islam, Fouta Djalon would not have agreed to help the Fula. In the course of the nineteenth century, numerous short-lived Fula Muslim states were established in this way: the Sokoto Caliphate, the Massina Empire (Diina), the Adamawa Emirate, and the Toucouleur Empire of El Hadj Umar Tall. Alpha Molo had also profited from this phenomenon to defeat the Mansa of Kaabu.

Alpha Molo Balde died in 1881 at Dandu (now in Guinea-Bissau) and his son  attempted to complete what his father had begun. After the death of Alpha Molo, French colonists began to enter the region in a significant way. Moussa Molo maintained a strong resistance against colonisation in the Upper Casamance, but he was defeated and killed in battle at Keserekunda in Gambia in 1931.

Population 
As its name suggests, the Fula form a majority of the population of Fuladu (about 55%). Most of the Fula in Fuladu are engaged in agriculture. They belong to the Fulbe Firdu group.

Minority ethnicities in Fuladu included the Mande Mandinka, Yalunka and Jakhanke people groups, as well as Wolofs, Jola, Bainuk, Balanta, and Manjacks.

Economy 
Cotton is cultivated and animal husbandry is practiced. Agriculture is very profitable in the region compared to other parts of Senegal, because it is one of the best watered parts of the country. The vegetation is very rich and a wide range of fruits and legumes are cultivated, as well as rice.

References

Bibliography 
 Moustapha Barry, L'implantation des Peuls du Fouta Djalon dans le Fouladou (1867-1958), Université Cheikh Anta Diop de Dakar, 2000 (Master's thesis)
 Gloria Lex, Le dialecte peul du Fouladou (Casamance-Sénégal) : étude phonétique et phonologique, Munich, LINCOM Europa, 2001, 554 p. 
 Abdarahmane N’Gaïdé, Le royaume peul du Fuladu de 1867 à 1936 (l’esclave, le colon et le marabout), Université de Dakar, 1998, 280 p. (Thesis)
 Cl. Niang, Structures sociales et pouvoir politique traditionnel en milieu peul du Fouladou, Université de Dakar, Faculté des lettres et sciences humaines, 1982
 Mouhamadou Mustapha Sow, Colonisation et domination économique en Casamance : l'exemple de la fiscalité au Fouladou, 1895-1920, Université Cheikh Anta Diop, 2000, 127 p. (Master's thesis)

External links 
 Koldanews, the portal of Fuladu online
 « Le Fouladou » (article by René Legrand in La Géographie, 15 July-15 December 1912, volume XXVI, n° 1–6) 
  Le commerce du lait chez les Peuls du Fouladou (Sud Sénégal). Organisation spatiale, dynamique organisationnelle et construction d’une identité régionale (Slideshow of Djiby Dia, ISRA - Institut sénégalais de recherches agricoles)

Regions of West Africa by country
Regions of Senegal
Geography of Senegal
Kingdoms of Senegal
19th-century establishments in Senegal
Former monarchies of Africa
Fula history
Former countries in Africa